The Phnom Kulen National Park is a national park in Cambodia, located in the Phnom Kulen mountain massif in Siem Reap Province. Its official name is Jayavarman-Norodom Phnom Kulen National Park.

During the Khmer Empire the area was known as Mahendraparvata (the mountain of Great Indra) and was the place where King Jayavarman II had himself declared chakravartin (King of Kings), an act which is considered the foundation of the empire.

Archaeological sites

There are several nature features, historical places, and other sights making Kulen National Park an interesting place to visit.

Chup Preah is a valley featuring several statues made during the 16th century.

The Kbal Spean archaeological site, also known as  "Valley of a thousand Lingas", is located on the mountain, along the Kbal Spean River, which is tributary of Siem Reap River.  The site has many figures of Yoni and Linga as well as other figures carved into the rocks of the riverbed and banks which may become fully exposed in the dry season when the river dries up.  The river is shallow and small waterfalls form at the site in the wet season. The site is accessible by trekking uphill through a  jungle track from the parking site.

Terrace of Sdach Kamlung is a plain terrace with a small ruined temple made of bricks in the middle.  The terrace was once covered with lava.

The statue is carved into a huge sandstone boulder. Preah Ang Thom is the sacred and worshipping god for Phnom Kulen. There are also two big trees of Cham Pa at nearby. Besides Preah Ang Thom, there are Chhok Ruot, footprint of Preah Bat Choan Tuk, Peung Chhok, Peung Ey So and Peung Ey Sey.

Waterfalls
There are two main waterfalls in Phnom Kulen: 

The size of the waterfalls varies according to the seasons and the rain. Visiting the waterfalls is a popular activity on Phnom Kulen tours.

Archeological activities
After initial reconnaissances by French scholars, the historical relevance of Phnom Kulen was pointed out by Philippe Stern, who visited it in 1936 and described Rong Chen as the first temple-mountain. In 1973 and 1979 Jean Boulbet and Bruno Dagens published the fundamental archeological inventory and mapping of Phonm Kulen. In 2008 Archaeology & Development Foundation begun Phnom Kulen Program, an archaeological project focused even on sustainable development of local communities.

In June 2013, an archaeological team announced the discovery and mapping of the ancient city of Mahendraparvata on the slopes of Phnom Kulen. The multi-year expedition was notable for its use of Lidar technology to reveal the layout of the city from beneath jungle and earth. 30 previously unidentified temples have been discovered.

References

Bibliography

External links
page on Phnom Kulen from the official website of Kingdom of Cambodia
AngkorGuide.Net
PeaceOfAngkorWeb.com
Andy Brouwer's blog on the less-visited angkorian temples of Phnom Kulen
Andy Brouwer's blog on newest archeological activities in Phnom Kulen
website of Phnom Kulen Program and a documentary on its activities
Protected areas in Cambodia

National parks of Cambodia
Protected areas established in 1993
Geography of Siem Reap province
Tourist attractions in Siem Reap province